Zapolyarny (masculine), Zapolyarnaya (feminine), or Zapolyarnoye (neuter) is the name of several urban localities in Russia:
Zapolyarny, Murmansk Oblast, a town in Pechengsky District of Murmansk Oblast
Zapolyarny, Komi Republic, an urban-type settlement under the administrative jurisdiction of Komsomolsky Urban-Type Settlement Administrative Territory under the administrative jurisdiction of the town of republic significance of Vorkuta in the Komi Republic
Zapolyarny, Yamalo-Nenets Autonomous Okrug, an urban-type settlement in Nadymsky District of Yamalo-Nenets Autonomous Okrug